Moving Gelatine Plates is a French progressive rock band first formed in 1968 by Gérard Bertram (guitarist) and Didier Thibault (bassist and band leader), who met in 1966 as 14-year-old schoolmates. Being heavily influenced by jazz, the band is considered to be part of progressive rock's Canterbury scene despite its national origin. In particular, the band's sound has been compared to Soft Machine. According to Thibault, the band’s name derives from the novel Travels with Charley: In Search of America by John Steinbeck.

Drummer Gérard Pons and multi-instrumentalist Maurice Hemlinger completed the line-up for the band’s first, self-titled album which was released by CBS in 1971. Moving Gelatine Plates under the same line-up released a second album with CBS in 1972 entitled The World of Genius Hans, which like their first effort met with little commercial success. Owing to financial problems resulting from poor sales, after releasing this album the band was soon forced to break up.

Thibault reformed the band with different members to release the album Moving in 1980 on the AMO label, shortly after which the band folded once more. The band reformed again to release a fourth album entitled Removing in 2006.

Discography
Moving Gelatine Plates (1971)
The World of Genius Hans (1972)
Moving (1980)
Removing (2006)

Filmography
 2015: Romantic Warriors III: Canterbury Tales (DVD)

References

External links
Discography on progarchives.com

French progressive rock groups
Musical groups established in 1968